Wi-jún-jon, also called Pigeon's Egg Head or The Light (1796–1872) was a Native American chief of the Assiniboine tribe, which is located in the Great Plains. He is best known as the subject of a painting by George Catlin, a dual portrait portraying him on the left side of the portrait in traditional garb and on the right side in contemporary Anglo-American garb after he was assimilated following a visit to Washington, D.C., in 1832.

Caitlin wrote that Wi-jún-jon "exchanged his beautifully garnished and classic costume" for
a suit of "broadcloth, of finest blue, trimmed with lace of gold; on his shoulders were mounted two immense epaulets; his neck was strangled with a shining black stock and his feet were pinioned in a pair of water-proof boots, with high heels which made him 'step like a yoked hog'."

A print based on the painting, showing Wi-jún-jon wearing Assiniboine dress and a Western suit, titled Wi-jún-jon, Pigeon's Egg Head, Going to Washington, returning to his house, became quite popular, appearing in a German magazine, Die Gartenlaube in 1853.

Early Life and Warriorhood 
As a young man, Wi-jún-jon became a warrior and participated in a number of battles and skirmishes against the U.S. Army as part of the broader resistance to American encroachment on Lakota land and resources. Wi-jún-jon was known for his bravery and tactical skills in battle, and he became a prominent leader in the Lakota resistance. He fought in many battles, including the Fetterman Fight of 1866 and the Battle of the Little Bighorn in 1876.

Diplomacy and Leadership 
Wi-jún-jon was also known for his diplomatic skills. He often served as a mediator between different Lakota bands and worked to maintain good relations with neighboring tribes. His reputation as a peacemaker and respected leader helped him gain the loyalty and trust of many of his fellow Lakota.

In the late 1860s, Wi-jún-jon became a participant in the Sun Dance ceremony and eventually became one of its leaders. The ceremony was a way for the Lakota to connect with their spiritual beliefs and honor the natural world. Wi-jún-jon's participation in the ceremony played an important role in shaping his worldview and approach to warfare. He believed that success in battle depended not just on physical strength but also on spiritual power and connection to the natural world.

Encounter with George Catlin 
One notable encounter in Wi-jún-jon's life was his meeting with the British artist George Catlin in the early 1830s. Catlin visited the Great Plains and created numerous paintings and sketches of Lakota life, including a portrait of Wi-jún-jon. Catlin was struck by Wi-jún-jon's distinctive hairstyle, which involved shaving the sides of his head and leaving a long strip of hair down the middle. Catlin's portrait of Wi-jún-jon became one of his most famous works.

Death 
Wi-jún-jon died in 1890, just before the Wounded Knee Massacre. His death is believed to have been related to the tensions between the U.S. Army and the Lakota following the Ghost Dance movement. In the late 19th century, the Ghost Dance, a religious movement that gained popularity among numerous Native American tribes, was perceived by the U.S. government as a challenge to their authority over Native American communities.

Legacy 
Wi-jún-jon's life and legacy continue to be celebrated by the Lakota and other indigenous communities today. He is remembered as a brave warrior, a wise leader, and a respected religious figure who embodied the values and traditions of his people.

References

1796 births
1872 deaths
1832 in Washington, D.C.
19th-century Native Americans
Assiniboine people
Cultural assimilation
Masterpiece Museum
Murdered Native American people
Native American leaders